A motorcycle taxi, or cart bike or bike taxi, is a licensed form of transport in some countries. The taxi typically carries one passenger, who "rides pillion" behind the motorcycle operator. Multiple passengers are common in some countries.

Brazil
According to some sources, motorcycle taxi service in Brazil began in 1994, in Crateús, in the state of Ceará, when an employee of the Bank of Brazil  Other sources state that it started in Bauru, São Paulo, in 1996, when an unemployed biker hung a banner across the road to the city, reading "help a biker racing to 1.00 real." Today, almost all Brazilian cities have motorcycle taxi services. Recently, they have appeared in poorer and less urban areas, where young people increasingly support themselves by driving them.

Typically, the fare is a flat fee, regardless of the distance traveled. However, the charge may vary according to the time of day or day of the week, or increase for distances that are greater than usual.

Licensing requirements for motorcycle taxis vary by municipality. Small towns tend not to regulate them at all, while in larger cities, they are regulated in much the same way as taxicabs. In July 2009, the Brazilian Senate approved standards for motorcycle taxi drivers and motorcycle couriers. They must be at least 21 years old, have held a Category A drivers licence for at least two years, and have attended a training course.

Cambodia
In Phnom Penh and other cities in Cambodia, motorcycle taxis are widely available as a form of low-cost public transport. Motorcycle taxi drivers, who are almost exclusively male, are called motodops (ម៉ូតូឌុប). They tend to hang around outside major tourist attractions, office buildings, public markets, and near the corners of residential streets. There is no regulated system of training or bike maintenance and no common uniform, so anyone on his way home from the market might offer you a ride (and the driver's intentions can generally be trusted, the state of his bike, a little less so). Always negotiate the fare in advance (use gestures, if necessary). Don't expect a motodop to understand English or to read a map - he'll likely flag somebody down who can help translate or navigate, if necessary. Fares vary depending on distance and weather but should always be cheaper than a tuk-tuk. Fares are higher at night and when embarking from tourist areas. You'll get a better rate if you can negotiate in passable Khmer, but have a heart: these are generally the folks that live on a few dollars or less per day. As of 2014, helmet laws apply only to drivers, so bring your own helmet if you're worried about safety, but it's not legally required.

The omnipresent ‘moto’ is the most common and fastest form of public transportation. Motos can be found virtually everywhere in town, just step to the curb and they will find you. Motos cost from 1500R-4000R for a trip in town and $6-$8 per day. Prices go up at night and for multiple passengers.

Cameroon

Motorcycle taxis are also the most common form of transportation in Maroua, Cameroon. Multiple passengers are carried on most trips; as many as four children are sometimes carried on a single motorcycle. Helmets are rarely used, but the traffic and speed are moderate in the city. Short distances cost about 200 francs, less than US$1.

China
In mainland China, motorcycle taxi service can be traced back to the late 1980s and early 1990s. There are currently motorcycle taxis throughout China, including in Beijing, Shanghai, and Guangzhou. They are popular primarily due to their low cost: the fare for short trips is just 5 yuan (less than US$1) per person.

India

In Goa, India, motorcycle taxis are required to be licensed. Driven by men called pilots, they are much cheaper than other taxis, although a passenger can only carry a backpack as luggage. In some parts of the state, motorcycle drivers are legally required to wear helmets, but any passengers riding pillion are not. Motorcycle taxis can usually be identified by their distinctive yellow and black colours. There is a practice to fix the fare in advance, and trips are not metered.

In last few years, a few companies such as Rapido, Uber and Ola have come up in multiple cities in India providing bike taxi services. With the Central Government's rule of allowing two-wheelers as legal and commercial vehicles and 8 states already legalized the same, it has become easier for the companies to design a working framework to provide easy and comfortable commute to the people.

Indonesia

Motorcycle taxis are a very common form of unlicensed transport in Indonesia, where they are known as ojek. Ojek can be found in most areas of the country, from towns where traffic jams commonly hinder other forms of transport, to rural areas inaccessible by four-wheeled vehicles. Because of the traffic, ojek are often the fastest form of transport, especially in big urban areas such as Jakarta, Surabaya, or Medan. Many people choose them over taxicabs, which are safer, but slower and more expensive.

Many ojek drivers either own their vehicles or are buying them on credit, although in some areas, stolen motorcycles are common. The widespread availability of cheap, domestic motorcycles made by Honda, Yamaha, and Suzuki, and even cheaper ones imported from China, as well as credit schemes with which to purchase these, have resulted in the rapid growth of ojek. The ease with which driver's licences can be obtained has also been a contributing factor.

Before the trip begins, the passenger usually haggles with the driver over the fare, which generally ranges from 5,000 to 10,000 rupiah (about US$0.50 to US$1.00) for short trips, longer trips will be more expensive. The fare may be different from one city to another city, as big city ojek will have higher fares than the smaller city ojek. Indonesia traffic law requires motorcycle riders and passengers to wear helmets; often on ojek, however, only the driver does so. Although the driver will sometimes provide a helmet for the passenger, more often, drivers simply avoid main streets, and the attention of police.

The name of Gojek is derived from the word ojek.

Mexico
In Mexico, there are thousands of motorcycle taxis. Their arrangements are informal (not traditional companies). They have precarious working conditions, long hours (11.3 hours a day), low wages (US$59.18 per week), and no social protections or benefits. 6.3% reported suffering from a disease, 49.5% corresponded to musculoskeletal conditions and only 11.6% were affiliated to any health system. 53.8% are owners of the vehicle and, although it does not seem to influence physical illness (P=0.03), it is related to the psychosocial ones (P=0.260).

Nigeria

Nigeria has about three million motorcycle taxis, locally called okadas, with over one million in Lagos alone. In Lagos, new rules prohibit okadas from carrying pregnant women or children. Authorities say okadas will be stopped from driving the wrong way, and the number of roads on which they are authorized to travel will be sharply reduced.

Philippines
Motorcycle taxis in the Philippines usually have sidecars, or seats extended sideways, often by use of a T-shaped crossbeam. The latter type of taxi is known as habal-habal, or a skylab, owing to its crude resemblance to the Skylab space station which orbited the Earth in the 1970s.

Covered, three-wheel autorickshaws, known as tricycles, are also a common mode of transport.

Angkas is a Philippine motorcycle vehicle for hire and delivery service company based in Makati, Metro Manila.

Motorcycle taxis were deemed illegal in 2020 due to possible exposure of passengers and riders to COVID-19 when in contact with each other, especially in the cities.

Thailand
Motorcycle taxis (or) are a common form of public transport in Bangkok and most other cities, towns, and villages in Thailand. They are generally used for short trips. In Bangkok, there are motorcycle taxi queues on many sois, or side streets, and the queues are regulated by land transport authority. Licensed motorcycle taxi operators wear orange vests with yellow number plates. The driving license with photo and driver's details in form of yellow card is placed on the back of the driver where the passenger can see clearly. In compliance with Thailand's motorcycle helmet law, many (but not all) drivers carry a spare helmet to offer to passengers. Bangkok locals generally only use motorcycle taxis when they need to get somewhere fast, as metered taxi-cabs can not only be more expensive for short trips but also slower than flat-rate motorcycles. Therefore, motorcycle taxi-drivers in Bangkok have built their reputation on delivering service as quickly as possible and tend to drive very fast and weave through traffic.

United Kingdom

Motorcycle taxi service in London began in 1990 as a niche industry. All equipment is provided for the passenger, along with an intercom system linking the rider and passenger. The motorcycles have racks that can hold a carry-on suitcase, for trips to local airports, especially Stansted, Gatwick, and City. The bikes are now licensed by Transport for London and the Public Carriage Office, which also license London's black cabs.

United States
Moto Limos Club, a motorcycle for-hire service, started in California and New York City in 2011. Passengers were not able to hail the motorcycles on the street; instead, a yearly individual or corporate membership fee is charged, plus an hourly rate. Experienced riders, many former Police motorcycle riders, carried clients on Honda Gold Wings, and in California, can bypass traffic congestion by lane splitting. Passengers were provided with helmets, airbag vests, and in-helmet, Bluetooth cell phones. The service also bought several Can-Am Spyders, before realizing they were not capable of splitting lanes.

Vietnam

Nimble [motorcycle taxis, which surpass buses in speed and mobility, comprise one of the most popular modes of transportation in Vietnam, where they are known as xe ôm. Passengers can get a ride via mobile app or by hailing passing operators, or by finding drivers who gather at public places such as schools, markets, hospitals, and bus and train stations.

Before the rise in popularity of ride-hailing apps, motorcycle taxi driving was a mostly informal economy, although some unions existed. Fare is verbally agreed upon before the trip based on distance. Some informal motorcycle taxi drivers still exist, as well as drivers working for regulated ride-hailing companies who would take on ad-hoc trips not booked through the app.

Wearing a helmet on motorcycles is required by Vietnamese laws for both drivers and passengers, as such motorcycle taxi drivers would provide helmet for their customers.

Go-Viet had a 35% market share among motorbike vehicle for hire companies in Ho Chi Minh City just six weeks after launching there on August 1, 2018, according to Go-Jek founder and chief executive Nadiem Makarim.

See also
 Boda-boda, an East African term for a bicycle taxi or motorcycle taxi
 Zémidjan, a term used in Benin for a motorcycle taxi

References

External links

Motorcycle classifications
Transport in Thailand